Pseudotsuga menziesii var. lindleyana, commonly known as the Mexican Douglas-fir, is a conifer in the genus Pseudotsuga that is endemic to Mexico.  DNA sequence and morphological evidence suggests it is most closely related to Rocky Mountain Douglas-fir (P. menziesii var. glauca) and might best be treated as an additional variety within P. menziesii.

Distribution
Pseudotsuga menziesii var. lindleyana is native to the Sierra Madre Occidental, Sierra Madre Oriental, and scattered mountains as far south as Oaxaca.
The Mexican Government lists Mexican Douglas-fir as "subject to special protection" because its populations are small, isolated and show signs of low fertility and recruitment due to inbreeding depression.

References

External links

 The Gymnosperm Database: Pseudotsuga lindleyana - Old Classification
The Gymnosperm Database: Pseudotsuga lindleyana in Pseudotsuga menziesii var. glauca - New Classification

lindleyana
Endemic flora of Mexico
Trees of Mexico
Flora of Northeastern Mexico
Flora of Northwestern Mexico
Flora of Central Mexico
Flora of the Sierra Madre Occidental
Flora of the Sierra Madre Oriental
Plants described in 1868